Typhloseiopsis is a genus of mites in the Phytoseiidae family.

Species
 Typhloseiopsis funiculatus De Leon, 1965
 Typhloseiopsis maryae McMurtry, 1983
 Typhloseiopsis neopritchardi Moraes & Mesa, 1988
 Typhloseiopsis pritchardi (Chant & Baker, 1965)
 Typhloseiopsis theodoliticus De Leon, 1959

References

Phytoseiidae